The Shandaken Tunnel is an aqueduct in Eastern New York State, part of the New York City water supply system. It was constructed between 1916 and 1924. The tunnel starts in Gilboa, New York at the Schoharie Reservoir, which is in the counties of Schoharie, Delaware, and Greene. The water flows south towards the Esopus Creek in Ulster County. It finally empties into a man-made pool in Allaben, New York, within the Town of Shandaken, and enters Esopus Creek there.

The tunnel is over 18 miles (29 km) in length, and carries water through Greene County and Ulster County. There are seven shafts along the tunnel, serving to aerate the water and provide an outlet for dissolved impurities to escape as gasses.

References

External links
video of a reservoir and the Shandaken Tunnel, 1920s 

Water tunnels in the United States
Tunnels in New York (state)
Water infrastructure of New York City
Catskill/Delaware watersheds
Transportation buildings and structures in Ulster County, New York
Transportation buildings and structures in Greene County, New York
Tunnels completed in 1924